The women's 100 metres at the 2018 IAAF World U20 Championships was held at Ratina Stadium on 11 and 12 July.

Records

Results

Heats
Qualification: First 4 of each heat (Q) and the 4 fastest times (q) qualified for the semifinals.

Wind:Heat 1: +0.8 m/s, Heat 2: +0.4 m/s, Heat 3: +1.9 m/s, Heat 4: +1.8 m/s, Heat 5: +0.2 m/s

Semifinals
Qualification: First 2 of each heat (Q) and the 2 fastest times (q) qualified for the final.

Wind:Heat 1: +0.4 m/s, Heat 2: -0.2 m/s, Heat 3: +0.3 m/s

Final

Wind: +0.3 m/s

References

100 metres
100 metres at the World Athletics U20 Championships